Per Almar Aas (11 June 1929, in Ballangen – 18 May 2014) was a Norwegian politician for the Christian Democratic Party.

He was elected to the Norwegian Parliament from Troms in 1973, and was re-elected on three occasions. He had previously served as a deputy representative during the term 1969–1973.

On the local level he was a member of Harstad municipal council from 1967 to 1971. From 1971 to 1975 he was a member of Troms county council. He chaired the county party chapter from 1970 to 1973, and was a member of the national party board from 1970 to 1973 and 1985 to 1999.
 
Outside politics he started his career as a manual laborer in Ballangen (1945–1950), Snåsa (1951), Ørsta (1951–1952) and Volda (1952–1953). In 1969 he settled in Harstad to become a school teacher.

References

1929 births
2014 deaths
People from Ballangen
Members of the Storting
Troms politicians
Christian Democratic Party (Norway) politicians
20th-century Norwegian politicians